Wawanesa is an unincorporated urban community in the Municipality of Oakland – Wawanesa within the Canadian province of Manitoba that held village status before January 1, 2015.  Wawanesa is considered to be the Cree word for whippoorwill (Douglas) or for wild goose nest (Rayburn). It is the birthplace of The Wawanesa Mutual Insurance Co.

Demographics 

In 2016, of those in Wawanesa aged 15 or older, 57.4% are married, 7.4% are living with a common-law partner, 18.0% have never been married, 2.1% are separated, 6.4% are divorced, and 8.5% are widowed.

Of the census families in Wawanesa, 52.9% consist of two persons, 11.8% consist of three persons, 20.6% consist of four persons, and the remaining 11.8% consist of five or more persons. The average size of a census family in Wawanesa is 2.9 persons. 53.3% of couple census families live without children, 10.0% live with one child, 23.3% live with two children, and 13.3% live with three or more children.

Notable people 
Notable people associated with Wawanesa have included suffragist Nellie McClung and Edna Diefenbaker, the first wife of Prime Minister John Diefenbaker.

References

External links 

Municipality of Oakland-Wawanesa

Designated places in Manitoba
Former villages in Manitoba
Populated places disestablished in 2015
2015 disestablishments in Manitoba